HMS Ulla Fersen was a frigate of the Swedish Royal Navy, designed by Frederik H. Chapman, and launched in 1789. She served during the Russo-Swedish War (1788-1790), most notably at the Battle of Reval. British vessels twice detained her, once in 1798 and again in 1801, with the first event resulting in a major court case bearing on the meaning of neutrality. She was completely rebuilt in 1802, and lost in a storm in 1807.

Design and construction
Frederik Henrik af Chapman, whom some credit as the first naval architect, designed Ulla Fersen. In 1787 he had proposed a ten-year plan that called for five ships of the line, six frigates, some storehouses, and a hospital. Various contingencies prevented the plan’s full implementation. Still, Ulla Fersen was the last ship built under the original plan. Although the Swedish navy referred to her as a frigate, or a light frigate, she may perhaps be better described as a corvette (contemporary French usage), or a sloop of war (contemporary British usage). She was named for Ulla (Ulrika Eleonora) von Höpken, née von Fersen, a Swedish lady-in-waiting and member of the nobility.

Russo-Swedish War
The Swedish Navy tasked Captain Olof Rudolf Cederström (1764–1833) and Ulla Fersen with executing, in 1790, the first naval operation of the war. Together with the frigate Jarramas he sailed to Rågå near Rågervik (also known as Baltischport in German and Rogerwick in English) in Estonia. There he expected to find a Russian squadron of 10-12 smaller vessels. When he arrived on 17 March (6 March OS) there was no Russian squadron. Cederström sent in a small landing party that destroyed a battery with 49 cannons and burned down a depot of grain and naval stores.

During the Battle of Reval, which took place on 13 May 1790 (2 May OS) off the port of Reval (now Tallinn, Estonia), Ulla Fersen served as the flagship for General-Admiral Prince Karl, Duke of Södermanland, brother to the Swedish king, Gustav III. The attempt to eliminate Admiral Chichagov's Russian squadron, which had wintered in the harbour at Reval, was unsuccessful, and Prince Karl signaled the withdrawal from Ulla Fersen, which had stayed out of Russian cannon shot.

Ulla Fersen vs. Busy and Speedwell
Captain John Ackworth Ommaney of Busy hailed Ulla Fersen and asked where the convoy was going. Cederström replied that they were bound for the “Spanish Sea”. Ommaney ordered the Swedes to permit boarding parties to inspect the merchant vessels to determine if they were carrying cargo proscribed under the British blockade and for destinations under enemy control. Cederström initially refused, but then relented and permitted the convoy to go into the Downs for further inspection.

Sweden was neutral at the time and Cederström was under strict orders from King Gustav IV of Sweden not to permit foreign interference with Swedish vessels in convoy under the protection of a Swedish naval vessel, and to resist with force if necessary. Still, Cederström chose to avoid loss of life and did not resist, and understandably so. Busy was armed with sixteen 32-pounder carronades and two 6-pounder guns, and Speedwell was armed with fourteen 4-pounder guns and 12 ½-pounder swivel guns. This gave the British a combined broadside in excess of 290 pounds, versus Ulla Fersons 54 pounds.

On 28 February 1803, a British court found that the Elsabe, Maas, master, was a legitimate prize. What is not clear from the decision is whether only one vessel was guilty of carrying potential naval stores to a destination under the blockade, or whether this was a test case for the entire convoy.

Cederström was recalled to Sweden and tried, presumably for disobeying orders. He was found guilty and sentenced to death. He was pardoned just before he was due to be executed and was for a while detained at a fortress. Still, he went on to have a distinguished career and ended up an admiral.

Dryad vs. Ulla Fersen
The Portsmouth Telegraph reported on 16 March 1801:  The Swedish frigate was the Ulla Fersen. The British frigate  returned from the Irish Station to Portsmouth on 18 March with both Ulla Fersen and the French privateer Premier Consul, which Dryad had captured at about the same time.
Ulla Fersen, was under the command of Captain Hans Hampus Fallstedt (1767–1808) and was on her way to the Swedish colony of Saint Barthelemy. Although clearly outgunned, as Dryad carried thirty-six 18-pounder guns and eight 32-pounder carronades, which gave her a broadside of 452 pounds, Fallstedt apparently wished to escape Cederström’s fate, hence the resistance and casualties. The British detained Ulla Fersen at Portsmouth and then released her after negotiations.

Fate
Ulla Fersen sank in a storm off Neuhoff on the island of Usedom, Germany, on 20 April 1807. Her captain at the time was Major Peter Holm. There is evidence to suggest that not all her crew was lost.

Notes, citations, and references
Notes

Citations

References

 Great Britain. Courts. Reports of cases argued and determined, 1798-1850. Volume 2.
 Harris, Daniel G. (1989) F H Chapman: The First Naval Architect and his Work. (Annapolis, Maryland: Naval Institute Press). 
  

 

Shipwrecks in the Baltic Sea
Age of Sail ships of Sweden
Ships of the Swedish Navy
Maritime incidents in 1807
Ships built in Karlskrona
1789 ships